Sylvain Lévesque (born November 30, 1973 in Lac-Mégantic, Quebec) is a Canadian politician, who serves as a member of the National Assembly of Quebec. First elected for the riding of Vanier-Les Rivières in the 2012 election, he was defeated in the 2014 election. He was elected to the National Assembly in the 2018 election, representing the district of Chauveau.

Lévesque was a columnist with Le Journal de Québec publication from 2016 to 2018 where he blogged under the title "spin doctor". After being announced as a candidate for Chauveau; the Le Journal de Montreal kept his blog because his positions "can be disputable, his analyzes of political strategies are worth the detour".

Electoral record

References

External links
 

1973 births
Living people
Coalition Avenir Québec MNAs
21st-century Canadian politicians
People from Lac-Mégantic, Quebec
Politicians from Quebec City